Pinchbottom is a theatrical burlesque company created by Jonny Porkpie and Nasty Canasta in 2004 and run by Porkpie since 2010. It is known for its brand of "theater-burlesque fusion"  which presents "full-length comedic play[s] in which performers take their clothes off in every other scene.".

Awards
The group was awarded the first-ever "Most Innovative" trophy for their performance at The Burlesque Hall of Fame in 2007, and named the "Best Burlesque" in New York by New York Magazine in 2007.

Productions

Major productions

Additional productions

References

Theatre companies in New York City
Burlesque